Carlos E. Bonilla was an American lobbyist and an advisor on economic policy to president George W. Bush. His last position was Senior Vice President to The Washington Group.

Background 
Bonilla held an undergraduate degree from The American University and a Masters in Economics from Georgetown University. Career highlights include:
 Senior Fellow at The Heritage Foundation
 Chief economist for the National Chamber Foundation at the United States Chamber of Commerce and at the Institute for Research on the Economics of Taxation (IRET).
 Chief economist for the Employment Policies Institute focusing on health care and employment issues.  
 Economist for the House Budget Committee under then-chairman John Kasich.
 Washington-based advisor to the Bush-Cheney campaign, advising on the Economic Growth and Tax Relief Reconciliation Act.
Bonilla joined George W. Bush Administration in January 2001 and served as Special Assistant for Economic Policy until early 2003.  He worked extensively on the first two tax bills, aviation issues, and pension issues including post-Enron reforms to 401(k) plans with significant work on issues affecting defined benefit plans).  In the aftermath of 9/11, he was responsible for ensuring that trade flows across the borders and through the ports were maintained in light of enhanced security concerns.  Other responsibilities included the inter-agency working group on West Coast ports during the 2003 labor dispute, leading up to a Taft-Hartley injunction.

In March 2003 Bonilla rejoined the private sector as a lobbyist for The Washington Group, representing such clients as Bio Marin Pharmaceuticals and Ranbaxy Pharmaceuticals.

In 2007 he joined the John McCain presidential campaign as an economic advisor, only to resign in May 2008 after the exposure of his ties to convicted lobbyist Jack Abramoff. The House Oversight Committee reported that Bonilla had accepted two tickets to a football game but did not report any improper actions by Bonilla on behalf of Abramoff.

He died on February 28, 2018, at the age of 63.

References

External links
 Lobbying profile at OpenSecrets.org
 

American lobbyists
The Heritage Foundation
Year of birth missing (living people)
American University alumni
Georgetown University Graduate School of Arts and Sciences alumni
Living people
Latino conservatism in the United States